The Holy Family Album is a television documentary written and narrated by Angela Carter. It was directed by Jo Ann Kaplan and produced by John Ellis at Large Door Productions, London, UK.  It was broadcast on the UK's Channel 4 on 3 December 1991 as part of the Without Walls series, commissioned by Waldemar Januszczak.

The documentary treats representations of Christ in Western art as if they are photographs in God's photo album.  According to John Ellis, the programme "caused considerable controversy", and was criticised in an editorial in The Times even before it was transmitted.  The programme was featured in Channel 4's review programme Right to Reply and a complaint to the Broadcasting Standards Council was not upheld.  It has not been retransmitted or published since Angela Carter's death in 1992.

References 

Charlotte Crofts (2003) Anagrams of Desire: Angela Carter's Writings for Radio, Film and Television (London: Chatto & Windus), pp. 168–193.

External links 
 Link to 'Holy Family Album' on Vimeo

Channel 4 original programming
Dramatic works by Angela Carter
Documentary films about Christianity
1991 television specials
British television documentaries